Sandra Liliana Beltrán, is a Colombian actress born on 5 June 1975 in Bucaramanga. She is well known as Yésica in the series Sin tetas no hay paraíso.

Telenovelas 
 El Señor de los Cielos 3ra. Temporada (2015) ... Julia Reyes de Rawlings
 Corazón Valiente (2012–2013) ... Yvonne Matamoros "La Niña Bonita"
 Reto de Mujer (2011) ... Raquel
 El Clon (2010)... Alicia
 El penúltimo beso (2008)  ...Gloria
 La marca del deseo (2007) ... Linda Pardo
 Sin tetas no hay paraíso (2006) ... Yésica, la diabla
 La mujer en el espejo (2005) ... Antonia Mutti
 Pecados capitales (2002) ... Eloisa
 A donde va soledad (2000) ... Jenny
 Rauzán (2000) ... María
 Se armó la gorda (2000) ... Ana María Mallarino

series 
 mujeres asesinas (2008)...sandra tramitadora
 Tiempo Final (2008)...Dia Perverso
 Regreso a la Guaca (2008)...Nubia
 los Caballeros las Prefieren Brutas (2011)...Sandy

References

People from Bucaramanga
Colombian telenovela actresses
Colombian television actresses
1975 births
Living people